The 1999–2000 NCAA Division III men's ice hockey season began on October 22, 1999 and concluded on March 18 of the following year. This was the 27th season of Division III college ice hockey.

Conference and rule changes
The NCAA began offering automatic bids for conference tournament champions for the first time. Partly due to this development, ECAC East split into two conferences when the NESCAC began sponsoring ice hockey as a sport and the 9 existing programs left ECAC East to form the new league. Each team in the ECAC East and NESCAC played one another in one game that counted in their respective conference standings.

Because the NESCAC now sponsored ice hockey as a varsity sport, the conference dropped the policy that allowed member schools to play in only one postseason tournament. Member teams could now play in both the conference tournament and the national tournament.

Despite the dissolution of the Division II Tournament, five eastern teams continued to compete as Division II programs. At the conclusion of the regular season they held an ECAC Division II Tournament rather than compete in their respective conference tournaments.

Minnesota–Crookston joined the MCHA, despite being a Division II program, and met conference guidelines by not offering scholarships to any players.

Regular season

Season tournaments

Standings

Note: Mini-game are not included in final standings

2000 NCAA tournament

Note: * denotes overtime period(s)

See also
 1999–2000 NCAA Division I men's ice hockey season

References

External links

 
NCAA